Writing Caste/Writing Gender: Narrating Dalit Women's Testimonios is a 2006 book written by Sharmila Rege and published by Zubaan India. This book is a theoretical analysis of Dalit Literature in India through the lens of gender. It is important for students of caste and gender studies.

Introduction

The introduction of the book begins by arguing that epistemological challenge posed by Dalit Movement and Literature was lost to social science students like us. Engagement with Dalit theoretical perspectives throws light on ‘theoretical brahmins’ and ‘empirical shudras’. They point to disjuncture between academic knowledge systems and social practices of caste. The reproduction of caste through idiom of citizenship or merit in post-Mandal era was first major challenge to caste studies. The second was the Dalit feminist assertions who challenged conceptualizing ‘genderless caste’ and ‘casteless gender’. The third major challenge to caste studies was the advocacy of Dalit human rights in Durban conference.
 
Although Women’s Studies in India have fought for establishing gender as category of analysis, the classical frameworks of understanding caste left marks in Women’s Studies. Few Women’s Studies scholars seriously engaged with Dalit feminist critiques. This can not be justified by savarna women ‘frozen in guilt’ i.e. assuming caste is sole concern of Dalit women. The complex histories of caste and gender oppression get lost in it. Neither can it be justified by as some Dalit feminist contend, upper caste women will necessarily be brahmanical. In the second case, there is slippage of Brahman and brahmanical and non Brahman and non brahmanical.

The self-reflection of women who have power and privilege of caste implies recognizing differences, power and connections of caste, class and community, so as to challenge our manufactured ignorance about cultures who have been violently marginalized.

One of the central questions guiding this book is, how can ‘private’ lived experiences and the ‘public’ practices of anti-caste struggles be brought into analysis of caste and gender? This book is part of pedagogical strategy to address dilemmas in Gender and Dalit Studies. It ‘translates’ lived experiences of caste as articulated in Dalit women’s ‘autobiographies’, or as the author uses the term, testimonios. (Spanish term for testimony)

Major arguments

In the section immediately following the introduction, the author debates the consumption and significance of Dalit testimonios. She argues that although publishing Dalit life narratives in English has gained popularity, the politics of consumption of Dalit literature is important to remember. The dangers of such politics are:

1.	Prioritization of certain type of literature and control of publishing by non-Dalits.

2.	The politics of selecting works, what is translated and by whom.

Various authors and historians like Anand Teltumbde and Gail Omvedt have tried to explain this spurt in publication after linking it to Durban conference and strategy of neo-liberal market to weaken/ co-opt Dalit movement. The popularity of Dalit autobiographies can be explained by reading them as narratives of pain without having to engage with politics and theory of Ambedkarism. Another serious issue is token inclusion of Dalit writings in the academy. In this context, Rege discusses which issues which have been part of debates in Dalit literary circles of Maharashtra.

The debates on the naming of this literature of protest persisted since 1960s. the term Dalit was first used by Dr. Ambedkar in 1928 in Bahiskrut Bharat. Although some Dalit scholars argued against writing autobiographies (as digging stench of past), some defended the importance of this genre by underlining its specific characteristics and its importance for community. Pantawane and others have argued for political significance of Dalit life narratives. Despite arguments against bringing undesired past to present, it is undeniable that life narratives are most direct ways in addressing silence on and misinterpretation of Dalits.

Another very important argument made by Rege is that Dalit life narratives are testimonios, which speaks for and beyond individual. It contests the ‘official forgetting’ of histories of caste oppressions, struggles and resistance. Dalit life narratives become the testimonies that summoned the truth from past.

Drawing from Beverley, Rege argues that in a testimonio the intention is to communicate the situation of a group’s oppression and struggle. The narrator calls upon the reader to respond actively. On one hand, in testimonio or dalit life narratives, the individual seeks collective affirmation. On other hand, by publicly bringing their experiences, in a way they challenge communitarian control over self. This dialectics of self and community gains more significance in dalit women’s testimonios because their location as women in the community influences their articulation of gender concerns, thus challenging the singular communitarian notion of dalit community. As testimonios of caste based oppression, anti-caste struggles and resistance, dalit life narratives are necessary for building critical pedagogies on caste system, as against canonical view of caste as ideology which hides experiential dimensions of caste based oppression.  
Thus Rege makes a case for not reading them merely as narratives of pain minus the politics of the dalit movement, nut as testimonios of caste based exploitation, everyday resistance and organized anti-caste struggles. Not only will it bring new theories/ understanding hut also at larger level, there will be democratization of knowledge.

In this context, what is the importance of dalit women’s testimonios? What is methodologically important is that do they remember and write differently? It is important to locate this difference in articulation of caste and women’s question historically. Therefore, in the next section she gives brief introduction to processes of caste, class formation and gender.

Reception

Karin Kapadia reviewed the book in the journal Economic and Political Weekly. She argues that this book consists of Dalit oral history through the autobiographical narratives of eight Dalit women writers from Maharashtra.  She places the value of book in the fact that it translated the narratives for the first time. She has a different view of the book when she says that the non-Brahmin interest is not necessarily Dalit interest.

Janaki Nair sees the contribution of the book in terms of enriching the Indian Feminist Historiography. She states:

Major concepts

Caste Studies

Gender Studies

Dalit literature

Dalit movement

Genderless caste

Casteless gender

World Conference against Racism 2001/ Durban Conference

Women’s studies

Dalit feminism

Testimonio/ Testimony

Anand Teltumbde

Gail Omvedt

Ambedkarism

See also
 Gender Studies
 Dalit literature
 World Conference against Racism 2001
 Women’s studies
 Testimony
 Anand Teltumbde
 Gail Omvedt
 B.R. Ambedkar

References

2006 non-fiction books
Dalit literature
Gender studies books